The 2020 Overwatch League playoffs was the postseason tournament of the 2020 Overwatch League regular season, which began on September 3 and concluded with the 2020 Grand Finals, the third championship match of the Overwatch League (OWL), on October 10.

Twelve teams competed in the OWL Playoffs, which was broken down into two double-elimination regional tournaments, the North America Bracket and Asia Bracket, that culminated into the double-elimination Grand Finals Bracket. The winner of each round of the playoffs was determined by a single-match. The final two teams remaining in the tournament advanced to the Grand Finals.

The defending OWL champions were the San Francisco Shock, who won the title against the Vancouver Titans in the 2019 OWL Grand Finals. The Shock defeated the Seoul Dynasty in the Grand Finals to claim their second consecutive Overwatch League title.

Format 
Twelve total teams qualified for the season playoffs split into two regional brackets. In the North America region, eight teams qualified for the North America Bracket. The top five teams from the regular season were awarded the top five seeds and the top three teams from the play-in tournament were awarded seeds six through eight. In the Asia region, four teams qualified for the Asia Bracket. The top two teams from the regular season were awarded the top two seeds and the top two teams from the play-in tournament were awarded three and four.

Each playoff bracket is a double-elimination tournament. However, the winners of the upper and lower finals in each respective bracket did not face each other. Instead, they both qualified for the Grand Finals bracket – another double-elimination tournament. The winners of the upper and lower bracket in the Grand Finals bracket played in the Grand Finals match.

Participants

North America

Asia

Brackets 
Teams in bold advanced to the next round. The numbers to the left of each team indicate the team's seeding in the bracket, and the numbers to the right indicate the number of maps the team won in that match.

North America

Asia

Grand Finals 

The Grand Finals Bracket will take place from October 8 to 10 in Asia.

Source:

Winnings 

Broadcast and viewership 
All matches of the playoffs were live-streamed and on-demand on YouTube.

References 

Overwatch
Playoffs